Vorbuse is a village in Tartu municipality, Tartu County in southern Estonia. Vorbuse is bordered by the Emajõgi River to the northeast and by the Tallinn–Tartu road (part of E263) to the south. The Tallinn–Tartu railway passes through the village and crosses the Emajõgi over the Jänese railway bridge. As of 2011 Census, the village's population was 258.

Wrestler August Pikker (1889–1976) was born in Vorbuse.

Gallery

References

Villages in Tartu County
Tartu
Kreis Dorpat